Tester, and variants Testar and Testard, is a surname of French origin, originally given as a nickname to one with a large head.

The name may refer to:

In the arts
 Desmond Tester (1919–2002), Anglo-Australian actor
 Ruth Tester (1903–1993), American actress
 Scan Tester (1887–1972), English folk and country musician
 William Tester (born 1960), American novelist

In politics
 John Tester (1835–1918), American politician and businessman
 Jon Tester (born 1956), U.S. Senator from Montana

Other people
 Mark Tester (born 1963), Australian botanist
 Ralph Tester (1902–1998), head of the Testery, a British codebreaking station at Bletchley Park

References